Maculosalia is a genus of flies in the family Tachinidae.

Species
 Maculosalia flavicercia Chao & Liu, 1986
 Maculosalia grisa Chao & Liu, 1986

References

Tachinidae